Syncoeliidae is a family of trematodes belonging to the order Plagiorchiida.

Genera:
 Copiatestes Crowcroft, 1948
 Otiotrema Setti, 1897
 Paronatrema Dollfus, 1937
 Syncoelium Looss, 1899

References

Plagiorchiida
Platyhelminthes families